Top Chef: San Francisco, originally broadcast simply as Top Chef, is the first season of the American reality television series Top Chef. It was first filmed in San Francisco, California, before concluding in Las Vegas, Nevada. The season premiered on March 8, 2006, and ended on May 24, 2006. The show featured chefs from around the United States living together in one house and competing in a series of culinary challenges. The series was hosted by Katie Lee Joel, in her only season as host, and judged by chef Tom Colicchio and food writer Gail Simmons. In the season finale, Harold Dieterle was declared the winner over runner-up Tiffani Faison.

Contestants
Twelve chefs were selected to compete in Top Chef: San Francisco. 

Tiffani Faison and Stephen Asprinio returned to compete in Top Chef: All-Stars. Faison later competed in Top Chef Duels. Lee Anne Wong returned for Top Chef: Colorado, competing in the Last Chance Kitchen, and Top Chef: All-Stars L.A.

Contestant progress

: The chef(s) did not receive immunity for winning the Quickfire Challenge.
: Cynthia voluntarily withdrew from the competition due to her father's illness.
: Andrea was brought back in Episode 3, after being eliminated once, when Cynthia chose to leave.
: The judges did not feel that anyone had distinguished themselves in the Elimination Challenge, so no winner was named.
 (WINNER) The chef won the season and was crowned "Top Chef".
 (RUNNER-UP) The chef was a runner-up for the season.
 (WIN) The chef won the Elimination Challenge.
 (HIGH) The chef was selected as one of the top entries in the Elimination Challenge but did not win.
 (IN) The chef was not selected as one of the top or bottom entries in the Elimination Challenge and was safe.
 (LOW) The chef was selected as one of the bottom entries in the Elimination Challenge but was not eliminated.
 (OUT) The chef lost the Elimination Challenge.
 (WDR) The chef voluntarily withdrew from the competition.

Episodes

References
Notes

Footnotes

External links
 Official website

Top Chef
2006 American television seasons
Television shows set in San Francisco
Television shows filmed in California
Television shows filmed in Nevada
Food and drink in the San Francisco Bay Area

es:Miguel Morales (cantante)